September 24 - Eastern Orthodox liturgical calendar - September 26

All fixed commemorations below celebrated on October 8 by Eastern Orthodox Churches on the Old Calendar.

For September 25th, Orthodox Churches on the Old Calendar commemorate the Saints listed on September 12.

Saints
 Monk-martyr Paphnutius and 546 companions, in Egypt (c. 303)  (see also: April 19 )
 Martyrs Paul and Tatta and their children Sabinian, Maximos, Rufus, and Eugene, of Damascus. 
 Venerable Euphrosyne of Alexandria, nun, and her father Venerable Paphnutius, monk (5th century)
 Venerable Theophilos the Confessor, Archbishop of Ephesus. 
 Saint Arsen the Great, Catholicos of Georgia (887)

Pre-Schism Western saints
 Saints Aurelia and Neomisia, at Anagni, peacefully. 
 Saint Herculanus, a soldier martyred in Rome. 
 Saint Firminus of Amiens, First Bishop of Amiens (4th century)
 Saint Caian of Tregaian (5th century) 
 Saint Principius, the elder brother of St Remigius of Rheims, he became Bishop of Soissons in France (c. 505)
 Saint Solemnis (Soleine, Solen), Bishop of Chartres (511)
 Saint Lupus of Lyons, Archbishop of Lyons (542)
 Saint Cadoc, Abbot, of Llancarfan (580)  (see also: January 24 )
 Saint Anacharius (Aunacharius, Aunachaire, Aunaire), Bishop of Auxerre and Confessor (604) 
 Saint Finbarr of Cork (Barrocus, Barry), first Bishop of Cork (c. 633)
 Saint Ermenfridus, a monk at Luxeuil Abbey in France, who later founded the monastery of Cusance (c. 670)
 Saint Mewrog, a saint in Wales.
 Saint Fymbert, a bishop in the west of Scotland (7th century)
 Saint Ceolfrith (Ceolfrid, Geoffrey), Abbot, of Wearmouth-Jarrow Monastery (716) 
 Saint Egelred, a monk at Crowland Abbey in England, martyred with his abbot and many others by the heathen Danes (c. 869)

Post-Schism Orthodox saints
 Saint Byzantinos. 
 Venerable Euphrosyne of Suzdal, nun (1250) 
 Repose of Venerable Sergius of Radonezh, Abbot of Radonezh and Wonderworker of All Russia (1392)
 Saint Dosithea the Recluse, of the Kiev Caves (1776)

New martyrs and confessors
 Saint Nicholas Rozov the Confessor, Priest (1941)

Other commemorations
 Commemoration of the earthquake in Constantinople in 447, when a boy was lifted up to heaven and heard the "Trisagion".
 First translation of the relics (1595) of St. Herman, Archbishop of Kazan (1567) 
 Repose of philosopher Alexei Stepanovich Khomiakov, cofounder of the Slavophile movement (1860)
 Uncovering of the relics of hieromartyrs Alexander Smirnov and Theodore Remizov, Presbyters (1985)

Icon gallery

Notes

References

Sources
 September 25/October 8. Orthodox Calendar (PRAVOSLAVIE.RU).
 October 8 / September 25. HOLY TRINITY RUSSIAN ORTHODOX CHURCH (A parish of the Patriarchate of Moscow).
 September 25. OCA - The Lives of the Saints.
 The Autonomous Orthodox Metropolia of Western Europe and the Americas (ROCOR). St. Hilarion Calendar of Saints for the year of our Lord 2004. St. Hilarion Press (Austin, TX). pp. 71–72.
 The Twenty-Fifth Day of the Month of September. Orthodoxy in China.
 September 25. Latin Saints of the Orthodox Patriarchate of Rome.
 The Roman Martyrology. Transl. by the Archbishop of Baltimore. Last Edition, According to the Copy Printed at Rome in 1914. Revised Edition, with the Imprimatur of His Eminence Cardinal Gibbons. Baltimore: John Murphy Company, 1916. pp. 296–297.
 Rev. Richard Stanton. A Menology of England and Wales, or, Brief Memorials of the Ancient British and English Saints Arranged According to the Calendar, Together with the Martyrs of the 16th and 17th Centuries. London: Burns & Oates, 1892. pp. 457–459.
Greek Sources
 Great Synaxaristes:  25 ΣΕΠΤΕΜΒΡΙΟΥ. ΜΕΓΑΣ ΣΥΝΑΞΑΡΙΣΤΗΣ.
  Συναξαριστής. 25 Σεπτεμβρίου. ECCLESIA.GR. (H ΕΚΚΛΗΣΙΑ ΤΗΣ ΕΛΛΑΔΟΣ).
  25/09/2016. Ορθόδοξος Συναξαριστής. 
Russian Sources
  8 октября (25 сентября). Православная Энциклопедия под редакцией Патриарха Московского и всея Руси Кирилла (электронная версия). (Orthodox Encyclopedia - Pravenc.ru).
  25 сентября по старому стилю  /  8 октября по новому стилю. Русская Православная Церковь - Православный церковный календарь на 2016 год.

September in the Eastern Orthodox calendar